A complex structure may refer to:

In mathematics
 Almost complex manifold
 Complex manifold
 Linear complex structure
 Generalized complex structure
 Complex structure deformation
 Complex vector bundle#Complex structure

In law
 Complex structure theory in English law

See also 
 Real structure